Noa or NOA may refer to:

People 
Noa (name)

Noa (Achinoam Nini), Israeli singer
 Noa, one of the five daughters of Zelophehad (her name is spelled "Noah" in some Bible translations)

Fictional 
 Noa (dog), a dog in Inubaka: Crazy for Dogs
 Ultraman Noa
 Nōa, a character from Fullmetal Alchemist the Movie: Conqueror of Shamballa

Places 
North Ossetia-Alania, a federal subject (republic) of Russia
HMAS Albatross (air station), IATA airport code "NOA"
 Noa Lake, a small lake at the head of the Dusen Fjord

Other uses 
.noa, a rare file extension that was used for some Japanese eroge games around 2002
Noa (band), a 1980s French Zeuhl group
Noa (Polynesian culture), a Māori term referring to the opposite of Tapu ("taboo")
National Observatory of Athens
National Outsourcing Association, former name of the Global Sourcing Association, a trade association in the United Kingdom
The Natural Ontological Attitude, a philosophy of science proposed by Arthur Fine
Naturally occurring asbestos
Navigate on Autopilot
Net operating assets
Nintendo of America
Nintendo of Australia
Olympic Air's former ICAO airline designator
Team NoA, a professional e-sports team
USS Noa (DD-841), US Navy destroyer

See also 
Noah (disambiguation)
NOAA